Slavica Đukić (born 7 January 1960 in Veliko Gradište, Serbia, FPR Yugoslavia) is a former Yugoslav/Austrian handball player who competed in the 1984 Summer Olympics, in the 1988 Summer Olympics, and in the 1992 Summer Olympics.

In 1984 she was a member of the Yugoslav handball team which won the gold medal. She played four matches as goalkeeper. Four years later she was part of the Yugoslav team which finished fourth. She played all five matches as goalkeeper. In 1992 she represented Austria at the Summer Olympics, finishing in fifth place.

External links
profile

1960 births
Living people
Yugoslav female handball players
Serbian female handball players
Austrian female handball players
Handball players at the 1984 Summer Olympics
Handball players at the 1988 Summer Olympics
Handball players at the 1992 Summer Olympics
Olympic handball players of Yugoslavia
Olympic handball players of Austria
Olympic gold medalists for Yugoslavia
Olympic medalists in handball
People from Veliko Gradište
Medalists at the 1984 Summer Olympics